Cité Niger, also called "Cité du Niger" is a Bamako neighborhood, and an island in the Niger River. The Cité du Niger is located in the Commune 2 of the Bamako district.

References

Bamako
Communities on the Niger River